Gastón Taratuta (born June 29, 1972) is the CEO and Founder of IMS Internet Media Services (IMS).

Career
He began his career as sales manager of Brazil's Universo Online (UOL), advancing to President of its subsidiary UOL-E Corp.

Prior to IMS, Taratuta spent six years at Universo Online, Brazil's largest ISP and digital publisher. He began as an e-commerce development manager out of Miami, Florida was promoted to head of sales and finished his career with UOL in 2004 as the company's President of International Operations in Miami. Taratuta founded IMS in 2005 after UOL closed its Miami office.

Gastón Taratuta is the founder and CEO of Aleph.

References

Argentine businesspeople
Living people
Argentine business executives
Argentine company founders
1972 births